A visible minority is defined by the Government of Canada as "persons, other than aboriginal peoples, who are non-Caucasian in race or non-white in colour". The term is used primarily as a demographic category by Statistics Canada, in connection with that country's Employment Equity policies. The qualifier "visible" was chosen by the Canadian authorities as a way to single out newer immigrant minorities from both Aboriginal Canadians and other "older" minorities distinguishable by language (French vs. English) and religion (Catholics vs. Protestants), which are "invisible" traits.

The term visible minority is sometimes used as a euphemism for "non-white". This is incorrect, in that the government definitions differ: Aboriginal people are not considered to be visible minorities, but are not necessarily white either. Also, some groups that are defined as "white" in other countries (such as Middle Eastern Americans) are defined as "visible minorities" in the official Canadian definition. In some cases, members of "visible minorities" may be visually indistinguishable from the majority population and/or may form a majority minority population locally (as is the case in Vancouver and Toronto).

Since the reform of Canada's immigration laws in the 1960s, immigration has been primarily of peoples from areas other than Europe, many of whom are visible minorities within Canada. Legally, members of visible minorities are defined by the Canadian Employment Equity Act as "persons, other than Aboriginal people, who are non-Caucasian in race or non-white in colour".

In Canada

9,639,200 Canadians identified as a member of a visible minority group in the 2021 Canadian Census, for 26.53% of the total population. This was an increase from the 2016 Census, when visible minorities accounted for 22.2% of the total population; from the 2011 Census, when visible minorities accounted for 19.1% of the total population; from the 2006 Census, when the proportion was 16.2%; from 2001, when the proportion was 13.4%; over 1996 (11.2%); over 1991 (9.4%) and 1981 (4.7%). In 1961, the visible minority population was less than 1%. 

The increase represents a significant shift in Canada's demographics related to record high immigration since the advent of its multiculturalism policies.

Statistics Canada projects that by 2041, visible minorities will make up 38.2–43.0% of the total Canadian population, compared with 26.5% in 2021. Statistics Canada further projects that among the working-age population (15 to 64 years), meanwhile, visible minorities are projected to make up 42.1–47.3% of Canada's total population, compared to 28.5% in 2021.

As per the 2021 census, of the provinces, British Columbia had the highest proportion of visible minorities, representing 34.4% of its population, followed by Ontario at 34.3%, Alberta at 27.8% and Manitoba at 22.2%. Additionally, as of 2021, the largest visible minority group was South Asian Canadians with a population of approximately 2.6 million, representing roughly 7.1% of the country's population, followed by Chinese Canadians (4.7%) and Black Canadians (4.3%).

Subdivisions with notable visible minority populations 
National average: 22.3%Source: Canada 2016 Census
Note: Subdivisions shown below have visible minority populations above the national average.

Alberta

 Edmonton
 Brooks
 Calgary
 Chestermere
 Wood Buffalo
 Banff

British Columbia

 Richmond
 Greater Vancouver A
 Burnaby
 Surrey
 Vancouver
 Coquitlam
 New Westminster
 West Vancouver
 Delta
 Abbotsford
 Port Coquitlam
 North Vancouver (city)
 Port Moody
 North Vancouver (district municipality)

Manitoba
 Winnipeg

Ontario

 Markham
 Brampton
 Richmond Hill
 Mississauga
 Ajax
 Toronto
 Pickering
 Milton
 Whitchurch-Stouffville
 Vaughan
 Oakville
 Windsor
 Aurora
 Waterloo
 Ottawa
 Newmarket
 Whitby

Quebec

 Brossard
 Dollard-des-Ormeaux
 Montréal
 Laval
 Mount Royal
 Kirkland
 Dorval

Legislative versus operational definitions
According to the Employment Equity Act of 1995, the definition of visible minority is: "persons, other than aboriginal peoples, who are non-Caucasian in race or non-white in colour".

This definition can be traced back to the 1984 Report of the Abella Commission on Equality in Employment. The Commission described the term visible minority as an "ambiguous categorization", but for practical purposes interpreted it to mean "visibly non-white". The Canadian government uses an operational definition by which it identifies the following groups as visible minorities: "Chinese, South Asian, Black, Filipino, Latin American, Southeast Asian, Arab, West Asian, Korean, Japanese, Visible minority, n.i.e. (n.i.e. means "not included elsewhere"), and Multiple visible minority". However, a few exceptions are applied to some groups. According to the Visible Minority Population and Population Group Reference Guide of the 2006 Census, the exception is:

The term "non-white" is used in the wording of the Employment Equity Act and in employment equity questionnaires distributed to applicants and employees. This is intended as a shorthand phrase for those who are in the Aboriginal and/or visible minority groups.

Controversy
The classification "visible minorities" has attracted controversy, both nationally and from abroad. The UN Committee on the Elimination of Racial Discrimination has stated that they have doubts regarding the use of this term since this term may be considered objectionable by certain minorities and recommended an evaluation of this term. In response, the Canadian government made efforts to evaluate how this term is used in Canadian society through commissioning of scholars and open workshops.

Another criticism stems from the semantic applicability of the classification. In some cases, members of "visible minorities" may be neither "visually" discernible from the majority population nor form a "minority", at least locally. For instance, many Latin Americans living in Canada self-identify as White Latin Americans and are visually indistinguishable from White Canadians. Moreover, some members of "visible minorities" may form a majority minority population locally (as is the case in most parts of Vancouver and Toronto). Since 2008, census data and media reports have suggested that the "visible minorities" label no longer makes sense in some large Canadian cities, due to immigration trends in recent decades. For example, "visible minorities" comprise the majority of the population in Toronto, Vancouver, Markham, Coquitlam, Richmond, Ajax, Burnaby, Greater Vancouver A, Mississauga, Surrey, Richmond Hill and Brampton.

Yet another criticism of the label concerns the composition of "visible minorities". Critics have noted that the groups comprising "visible minorities" have little in common with each other, as they include both disadvantaged groups and groups who are not economically disadvantaged. The concept of visible minority has been cited in demography research as an example of a statistext, meaning a census category that has been contrived for a particular public policy purpose. As the term "visible minorities" is seen as creating a racialized group, some advocate for "global majority" as a more appropriate alternative.

Furthermore it is not clear why minority definition should center on the "visual", and the concept of "audible minority" (e.g. those who speak with what appears to the majority to be "accented" English or French) has also been proposed, as speech often forms the basis for prejudice, along with appearance.

See also

Affirmative action
Classification of ethnicity in the United Kingdom
Colourism
Employment equity (Canada)
Ethnic penalty
List of visible minority politicians in Canada
Majority minority
Minority language
Multiculturalism in Canada
Race and ethnicity in censuses
Race and ethnicity in the United States Census
Racialism (Racial categorization)

References

External links

 Visible minority population and population group reference guide (2006 Census) from Statistics Canada
 Visible minority population, by census metropolitan areas (2006 Census) from Statistics Canada

 
Affirmative action in North America
Canadian English
Canadian identity
Society of Canada
Demographics of Canada
Human rights in Canada
Minorities
Multiculturalism
Race and society
Social groups
Sociological terminology